Too Few For Drums is a 1964 war adventure novel by the British writer R.F. Delderfield. A small unit of British soldiers get cut off from the rest of their army by French forces during the Peninsular War.

References

Bibliography
 Sternlicht, Sanford. R.F. Delderfield. Twayne Publishers, 1988.

1964 British novels
British historical novels
British adventure novels
Novels by R. F. Delderfield
Novels set in the 1810s
Novels set during the Napoleonic Wars
Peninsular War in fiction
Hodder & Stoughton books